The Alaska Nanooks men's ice hockey team is a National Collegiate Athletic Association (NCAA) Division I college ice hockey program that represents the University of Alaska Fairbanks. The Nanooks are an Independent program. They play at the Carlson Center in Fairbanks, Alaska.

History

Early history (1925–1973)
Varsity hockey at Alaska-Fairbanks began in 1925. The team played four games during the inaugural 1925–26 season and finished the season with a 3–1–0 record despite having no coach. The program returned in 1932 and for three additional seasons the team operated without a coach as an independent collegiate program. Alfred Bastress joined the Nanooks in 1937 and became the program's first head coach. Bastress led the Nanooks for four seasons. The team played the 1939–40 season again with no coach and Joe Gerlach coached the team during the 1941–42 season, splitting both games the team played that season. The program was suspended during World War II and returned for the 1949–50 season.

The team went through six coaches through the 1950s before Bill Daltri took over behind the bench in 1960. Daltri led the Nanooks for three seasons, including some of the most successful seasons of the early history of the program. In 1960–61 Daltri's Nanooks finished with a record of 14–2–0 and in the 1961–62 season the team finished 10–1–1. In his final season as head coach Daltri's Nanooks won all 8 games of the 1962–63 season. The program would go through another period of coaching turnovers, going through 9 coaches in a ten-year period from 1963–1973.

Division II era (1973–1984)
Following the 1972–73 season the program moved from the University Division to NCAA Division II, when the different levels became numerically organized. Between '74 and '80 the Nanooks played just two seasons as a varsity program and continued to have trouble scheduling opponents. After a reinvestment in the program, Ric Schafer took over as head coach in 1980 and began to build the Nanooks into a respectable team. After winning just twice in his first two seasons, Schafer got the team to post a program-record 19 wins in 1983 and then produce back-to-back 20+ win seasons immediately afterwards. In 1984, the entire Division II ice hockey level collapsed and, while most programs dropped down to Division III, Alaska promoted the ice hockey team to Division I.

Great West Hockey Conference and independence (1985–1994)
After a year as an independent program, The Nanooks joined with in-state rival Alaska-Anchorage as well as U.S. International University (San Diego) and Northern Arizona University (Flagstaff, Arizona) to form the Great West Hockey Conference.

Though small to begin with, the GWHC shrunk when Northern Arizona suspended their varsity program after the first season. The conference lasted just three years in total, but it was long enough for Alaska's new head coach, Don Lucia, to lead the team to its first ever conference title in 1988.

U.S. International followed Northern Arizona into ice hockey oblivion in 1988, leaving the two Alaska schools to play as independents for several years. With Alaska being so far away from most other Division I programs, the NCAA does not include any games played against either school as part of a team's game limit during the season. This enabled Alaska to survive during the early 1990s and post three separate 20-win seasons.

CCHA / WCHA (1994–2021)

in 1994, while Anchorage joined the WCHA, Alaska was invited to participate as an affiliate member of the CCHA. While none of their games were counted in the conference standings, the stabilization of their schedule provided a solid footing for the Nanooks to build their program.

Dave Laurion, who had replaced Lucia in 1993, led Alaska for their early tenure in the CCHA but couldn't get the team out of the cellar. Guy Gadowsky was brought in in 1999 and raised the profile of the Nanooks after a few lean years. Gadowsky left to take over at Princeton in 2004 and the program began to slip back down the standings until Dallas Ferguson was introduced in 2008. In just his second season with the program, Ferguson led the Nanooks to their first ever NCAA Tournament appearance and kept the team in good standing for most of his 9-years with the program.

2011 saw significant changes for the program, beginning with the announcement by the Big Ten Conference that it would begin sponsoring men's ice hockey in 2013. While that would cause three teams from the CCHA to leave for their primary conference, Miami joined with five other schools from the WCHA to form a separate conference, the NCHC. The CCHA disintegration continued when Northern Michigan was approved for membership in the WCHA, and the conference began scrambling to find a way to survive.

On August 23, 2011 members of the WCHA and CCHA met in Chicago, Illinois in reaction to the realignment. Afterwards, the WCHA sent invitations to the five remaining CCHA schools and Alaska quickly accepted the invitation to join the league for the 2013–14 season.

Later in the year, administrative officials at Alaska discovered that the school had failed to properly monitor the academic eligibility of several players from multiple sports dating back to 2007. The violations were immediately brought to the attention of the NCAA and an investigation began to determine the size and scope of the failure. In 2014 the NCAA concluded their findings and determined that UAF was 'lacking in institutional control' and had failed to update an 'inadequate compliance system' despite warnings to that effect. The majority of the violations were from players either not declaring a major, not accruing enough credits towards their declared major(s) or junior college transfers failing to meet academic eligibility standards. The school admitted guilt and was required to pay a fine, suspend several scholarships and forfeit all wins and ties in games where ineligible players participated. As a result, the ice hockey program now has no wins from 2007–08 through the 2011–12 season and was forced to vacate their lone NCAA tournament appearance in 2010. Alaska was also ruled ineligible for participation during the 2015 postseason.

The second decade of the 20th century continued to be unkind to the Nanooks; despite finishing with winning records during several seasons, Alaska lost every single playoff round they participated in from 2011 through 2020. In 2019, seven teams from the WCHA announced that they would be leaving the conference to form a more geographically-cohesive conference. With Alaska being approximately 3,000 miles away from the nearest opponent (excluding Anchorage) the Nanooks were in jeopardy of returning to independent status. Then, as if to add insult to injury, Alaska was forced to cancel its entire 2020-21 season due to the COVID-19 pandemic. All of this was also happening under a cloud of financial hardship caused by state budget crunch. The funding for the program became so tenuous that a proposal was circulated to merge the Nanooks with the Seawolves in order to save money. The plan never came to pass but constraints eventually led to the temporary suspension of Alaska Anchorage's program.

Wilderness years (2021–present)
When Alaska returned to the ice in 2021, they did so as an independent. The only saving grace for their position was that they were not alone in that situation. Alaska was able to schedule several meetings with the other two conference-free programs (Arizona State and Long Island) and put together a solid season after a difficult start.

Brice Alaska Goal Rush

The Brice Alaska Goal Rush is one of two annual ice hockey tournaments (along with the Kendall Hockey Classic) that are traditionally played in the first two weeks of the NCAA Division-I season. The Kendall tournament opens the season, and the Alaska Goal Rush is played in the second week. The tournament is held at the Carlson Center in Fairbanks, Alaska, and is hosted by University of Alaska-Fairbanks hockey team.

The tournament takes place over two days and follows a round robin format. The hockey team from the University of Alaska-Anchorage is a regular participant and serves as an unofficial co-host, while two guest schools round out the tournament field every year. Each of the Alaska schools plays one game against the guest teams, but do not play against each other. The invitees do not square off either. The first criteria to determine place order are records, and then goal-differential in the event of any ties.

The tournament began in the fall of 2008, and its title is a play on the historical Alaska Gold Rush. Fairbanks has won the tournament four times (most recently in 2013), and Anchorage has won it twice. No guest team has been able to win the crown yet in its six-year history.

Tournament results

Season-by-season results

Coaches
Typically, Alaska has not had much luck in keeping their coaches for very long. The program has had 26 different head coaches in 69 seasons from 1925 to 2018 and played six of those years without a bench boss. This is not only the most overall for any Division I hockey team but it is among the lowest average (2.65 years) for any school in any sport. As of 2018 Dallas Ferguson was the longest-tenured coach in the history of the program, serving for 9 seasons.

All-time coaching records
As of completion of 2021–22 season

†Alaska was retroactively forced to forfeit all wins and ties from 2007–08 through 2011–12 due to player ineligibilities.

Players

Current roster
As of August 12, 2022.

Nanooks in the NHL
As of July 1, 2022.

Source:

References

External links
 

 
Ice hockey teams in Alaska
1925 establishments in Alaska
Ice hockey clubs established in 1925